Dougie Fife (born 8 August 1990) is a Scottish rugby union player who currently plays for the New Orleans Gold of Major League Rugby (MLR). He previously played for Edinburgh Rugby and the New England Free Jacks.

Career

He has represented Scotland at the under-17, under-19 and under-20 age groups, as well as in the IRB Sevens World Series. Fife spent most of the 2010–11 season with the Scotland Sevens team.

Fife received his first full international call-up on 15 January 2014, when he was named in Scotland's 36-man training squad ahead of the 2014 Six Nations Championship by Head Coach Scott Johnson. His first international try came during a narrow defeat to France on the opening weekend of the 2015 Six Nations Championship.

At the end of the 2015–16 season Fife left Edinburgh Rugby for the Scotland 7s team before rejoining for the 2017–18 season. He was called up to Scotland's 2018 summer tour of the Americas, scoring tries in both appearances (against the US and Argentina).

Fife signed a two-year contract with the US Major League Rugby team New England Free Jacks in August 2020. He started 29 games over two seasons and led the Free Jacks to a first-place divisional finish and playoff appearance in 2022. In September 2022 the New Orleans Gold announced they had signed Fife to a two-year contact. He currently plays fullback for the team.

References

External links 
 
 
 Dougie Fife at itsrugby.co.uk

1990 births
Living people
Edinburgh Rugby players
Scottish rugby union players
Scotland international rugby union players
Rugby union players from Edinburgh
Rugby union wings
Currie RFC players
Scotland international rugby sevens players
Male rugby sevens players
Scotland Club XV international rugby union players
New England Free Jacks players
New Orleans Gold players